Rising Dream is Croatian power metal/melodic death metal band from Zadar.

History

The name Rising Dream has in a short time become a brand in the European metal community when the Croatian scene is talked about. Five years since it was founded, the band became the leader of the scene.

On August 8, 2008 Rising Dream issued their debut album Failed Apocalypse. Their concerts are famous for their intensity and spectacle, and they are able to make tens of thousands of people to frantically support them during their shows. Some of the biggest metal and hard rock bands have asked them to be their special guests. Deep Purple, Motörhead, Soulfly, Slayer, Anthrax, Helloween, HammerFall are just some of the bands Rising Dream have supported during the years. Iron Maiden has hand-picked Rising Dream to be their special guest at the stadium show in Split, Croatia on August 10, 2008, in front of over 20,000 fans. Rising Dream was the only band on the entire Maiden tour that got the chance to play their full 70-minute show.

The debut album's producer Denis Mujadžić Denyken is the most famous and most awarded Croatian rock and metal producer, and Visions of Atlantis and Aesma Daeva singer Melissa Ferlaak appears as a special guest. In October 2008, Rising Dream have recorded their live performance in front of the Croatian national television's cameras, thus becoming the first metal performers to get significant treatment from that particular broadcasting company.

Beginning the April 23rd, Rising Dream, together with German thrash metal band Destruction began a special leg of the Destruction world tour D.E.V.O.L.U.T.I.O.N., which is also first leg of their Failed Tour 2009, showcasing their album Failed Apocalypse all around Europe. This leg occupied 12 shows in 8 countries (Switzerland, Italy, Austria, Slovakia, Romania, Bulgaria, Greece and Serbia).

In February 2010 the band announced that female singer Ines Tančeva had joined the band.

Members 
 Ines Tančeva  – vocals (2010–2013)
 Joško Barbir  – guitar (2004–present)
 Ivan Kutija  – keyboard (2004–2013)
 Goran Paleka  – guitar (2004–present)
 Igor Goić  – drums (2004–present)
 Filip Letinić  – bass guitar (2007–present)
 Tomislav Šanić  – vocals (2013–present)

Discography
The Rising Madness (Demo / 2004)
The Spheres (Demo / 2007)
Failed Apocalypse (Dallas Records, 2008)

References

External links
Official Website
Official MySpace
Official Reverbnation

Croatian heavy metal musical groups
Power metal musical groups
Musical groups established in 2004